The 1990–91 FC Bayern Munich season was the 91st season in the club's history and 26th season since promotion from Regionalliga Süd in 1965.  Bayern finished three points behind champions 1. FC Kaiserslautern in the Bundesliga.  In the DFB-Pokal, Bayern were eliminated in the first round for the first time in club history.  Bayern reached the semifinals of the European Cup before being eliminated by Red Star Belgrade due to an own goal in the 90th minute of the second leg.  The first competitive match of the season was the DFB-Supercup on 31 July which Bayern won by a score of 4–1 over 1. FC Kaiserslautern.

Review and events

Pre-season
Players to transfer to Bayern this summer were:  Stefan Effenberg from Borussia Mönchengladbach, Gerald Hillringhaus from SV Türk Gücü München, Brian Laudrup from Bayer 05 Uerdingen, Michael Sternkopf from Karlsruher SC, and Christian Ziege from Hertha Zehlendorf.  Rainer Aigner was promoted from Bayern Munich II and Markus Münch was promoted from Bayern Munich Junior Team.  Ludwig Kögl left Bayern for VfB Stuttgart, Thomas Kastenmaier left for Borussia Mönchengladbach, and Hansi Flick left for 1. FC Köln. The Fuji-Cup took place on 24 July and 25 July in Lüdenscheid.  The semifinal match against Borussia Dortmund finished as a goalless draw which was decided by a penalty shoot-out with Bayern going to the third place match.  The third place match against 1. FC Köln was won by a score of 4–1.  Bayern defeated 1. FC Kaiserslautern in the DFB-Supercup on 31 July 4–1.

August
Bayern faced FV 09 Weinheim in the first round of the DFB-Pokal on 4 August.  FV 09 Weinheim won the match 1–0 due to a penalty kick scored by Thomas Schwechheimer after a foul by Thomas Strunz which resulted in a red card.  Due to the loss, Bayern were eliminated from the DFB-Pokal in the first round for the first time in club history. The first Bundesliga match of the season took place on 11 August which resulted in a 1–1 draw against Bayer 04 Leverkusen. On 14 August, Bayern faced FC St. Pauli in a match that ended goalless. The Teresa Herrera Trophy took place 16–18 August.  In a semifinal match against S.L. Benfica, Bayern lost 1–2.  In the third place match on 18 August against Deportivo de La Coruña, Bayern won 3–2 due to a hat-trick by Alan McInally. The first win of the Bundesliga season came against VfB Stuttgart 2–1 on 25 August.

September
September started with a 3–2 win over Karlsruher SC on 1 September. The win streak continued on 7 September when Bayern defeated 1. FC Kaiserslautern 4–0. By defeating Fortuna Düsseldorf 2–1 on 15 September, Bayern extended its win streak to four matches. The first European Cup match took place on 19 September when Bayern defeated APOEL F.C. 3–2. A 2–2 draw against VfL Bochum on 22 September kept Bayern undefeated through seven Bundesliga matches. The first loss of the Bundesliga season came on 28 September against SV Werder Bremen with Bayern losing 0–1.

October
The second leg of the European Cup first round was played on 2 October.  Bayern won this match 4–0 over APOEL which resulted in an aggregate score of 7–2 allowing Bayern to advance to the second round.  Radmilo Mihajlović scored a hat-trick in this match. Bayern defeated Borussia Mönchengladbach 4–1 on 6 October. The 0–4 loss to 1. FC Köln on 13 October saw three red cards, two for Bayern and one for Köln. Hamburger SV faced Bayern on 20 October in a match which Bayern won 6–1. The first leg of the second round of the European Cup took place on 23 October with Bayern defeating PFC CSKA Sofia 4–0. October ended with a 4–1 victory over Eintracht Frankfurt on 27 October.

November

On 6 November, Bayern defeated PFC CSKA Sofia 3–0 (7–0 aggregate) to move on to the quarterfinals of the European Cup.  The third loss of the Bundesliga season came on 10 November to Borussia Dortmund by a score of 2–3. A goalless draw with Hertha BSC followed on 17 November.  The final Bundesliga match of the month came on 24 November when Bayern defeated SG Wattenscheid 09 7–0. On 27 November, Bayern, champions of 1989–90 Bundesliga, and Dynamo Dresden, champions of 1989–90 DDR-Oberliga, took part in the Deutschland Cup as a part of German reunification.  Dresden won the match 1–0.

December–February
On 8 December, Bayern defeated 1. FC Nürnberg 1–0.  The final Bundesliga game of the first half of the season was a 1–1 draw with Bayer 05 Uerdingen which left Bayern in second place.  The Bundesliga took a two-month winter break between matchday 17 and matchday 18.  Winter saw transfers of Radmilo Mihajlović to FC Schalke 04 and Hans Dorfner to 1. FC Nürnberg.  Bayern competed in the Miami Cup in Miami, Florida.  A goalless draw against Colombia took place on 1 February.  Bayern defeated the United States 4–0 on 3 February.  The Fort Lauderdale Strikers held Bayern to a goalless draw in a friendly played on 6 February.  A match against Bayer Leverkusen on 23 February was the only competitive match of the month.  Bayern won by the score 2–1.

March
St. Pauli defeated Bayern 0–1 on 2 March. The first leg of the European Cup quarterfinals on 6 March ended 1–1 against FC Porto.  Bayern defeated VfB Stuttgart on 9 March 3–0.  On 15 March, Bayern defeated Karlsruher SC 3–0.  Bayern defeated Porto 2–0 (3–1 aggregate) on 20 March to advance to the semifinals of the European Cup.  The fifth Bundesliga loss of the season came on 23 March against 1. FC Kaiserslautern.  Bayern, reduced to 10 men after a 65th minute red card for Manfred Bender, lost the match 1–2.

April
Fortuna Düsseldorf defeated Bayern 0–1 on 2 April.  After two consecutive losses, Bayern defeated VfL Bochum 2–1.  The first leg of the European Cup semifinals against Red Star Belgrade on 10 April ended in a 1–2 loss.  A 1–1 draw against Werder Bremen was played on 13 April.  Borussia Mönchengladbach also held Bayern to a 1–1 draw on 16 April.  The final Bundesliga match of the month was a 2–2 draw with 1. FC Köln.  An own goal in the 90th minute by Klaus Augenthaler in the second leg of the European Cup semifinals on 24 April saw Bayern eliminated from the competition.  The goal caused the game to be a 2–2 draw but the aggregate score of 3–4 saw eventual champions Red Star Belgrade advance to the finals.

May
Bayern had a perfect record in May with wins over Hamburger SV, Eintracht Frankfurt, Borussia Dortmund, and Hertha BSC. On 5 May, Bayern defeated Hamburger SV 3–2.  Bayern defeated Eintracht Frankfurt 2–0 on 11 May. The win streak continued against Borussia Dortmund on 17 May with Bayern winning 3–2.  The final match of the month, on 25 May, was a 7–3 victory over Hertha BSC.  Olaf Thon scored a hat-trick in this match.

June
The win streak came to an end on 1 June when Bayern lost to SG Wattenscheid 09 2–3.  This loss was followed by a win over 1. FC Nürnberg by a score of 1–0.  A 2–2 draw against Bayer 05 Uerdingen on the final matchday saw Bayern finish in second place three points behind Bundesliga champion 1. FC Kaiserslautern.

Results

Friendlies

Fuji-Cup

Teresa Herrera Trophy

Miami Cup
Bayern Munich finished second in the final table of the tournament.

Other friendlies

Bundesliga

Results

Bundesliga

League table

League standings

DFB Pokal

DFB-Supercup

Deutschland Cup

European Cup

1st round

2nd round

Quarterfinals

Semifinals

Team statistics

Players

Squad, appearances and goals

|-
|colspan="14"|Players sold or loaned out after the start of the season:

|}

Minutes played

Bookings

Transfers

In

Out

References

FC Bayern Munich seasons
Bayern